Antivenom, also known as antivenin, venom antiserum, and antivenom immunoglobulin, is a specific treatment for envenomation. It is composed of antibodies and used to treat certain venomous bites and stings. Antivenoms are recommended only if there is significant toxicity or a high risk of toxicity. The specific antivenom needed depends on the species involved. It is given by injection.

Side effects may be severe. They include serum sickness, shortness of breath, and allergic reactions including anaphylaxis. Antivenom is traditionally made by collecting venom from the relevant animal and injecting small amounts of it into a domestic animal. The antibodies that form are then collected from the domestic animal's blood and purified. 

Versions are available for spider bites, snake bites, fish stings, and scorpion stings. 
Due to the high cost of producing antibody-based antivenoms and their short shelf lives when not refrigerated, alternative methods of production of antivenoms are being actively explored. One such different method of production involves production from bacteria. Another approach is to develop targeted drugs (which, unlike antibodies, are usually synthetic and easier to manufacture at scale).

Antivenom was first developed in the late 19th century and came into common use in the 1950s. It is on the World Health Organization's List of Essential Medicines.

Medical uses
Antivenom is used to treat certain venomous bites and stings. They are recommended only if there is significant toxicity or a high risk of toxicity. The specific antivenom needed depends on the venomous species involved.

In the US, approved antivenom, including for pit viper (rattlesnake, copperhead and water moccasin) snakebite, is based on a purified product made in sheep known as CroFab. It was approved by the FDA in October, 2000. U.S. coral snake antivenom is no longer manufactured, and remaining stocks of in-date antivenom for coral snakebite expired in the Fall of 2009, leaving the U.S. without a coral snake antivenom. Efforts are being made to obtain approval for a coral snake antivenom produced in Mexico which would work against U.S. coral snakebite, but such approval remains speculative.

As an alternative when conventional antivenom is not available, hospitals sometimes use an intravenous version of the antiparalytic drug neostigmine to delay the effects of neurotoxic envenomation through snakebite. Some promising research results have also been reported for administering the drug nasally as a "universal antivenom" for neurotoxic snakebite treatment.

A monovalent antivenom is specific for one toxin or species, while a polyvalent one is effective against multiple toxins or species.

The majority of antivenoms (including all snake antivenoms) are administered intravenously; however, stonefish and redback spider antivenoms are given intramuscularly.  The intramuscular route has been questioned in some situations as not uniformly effective.

Antivenoms bind to and neutralize the venom, halting further damage, but do not reverse damage already done.  Thus, they should be given as soon as possible after the venom has been injected, but are of some benefit as long as venom is present in the body.  Since the advent of antivenoms, some bites which were previously invariably fatal have become only rarely fatal provided that the antivenom is given soon enough.

Side effects
Antivenoms are purified from animal serum by several processes and may contain other serum proteins that can act as immunogens.  Some individuals may react to the antivenom with an immediate hypersensitivity reaction (anaphylaxis) or a delayed hypersensitivity (serum sickness) reaction, and antivenom should, therefore, be used with caution. Although rare, severe hypersensitivity reactions including anaphylaxis to antivenom are possible. Despite this caution, antivenom is typically the sole effective treatment for a life-threatening condition, and once the precautions for managing these reactions are in place, an anaphylactoid reaction is not grounds to refuse to give antivenom if otherwise indicated.  Although it is a popular myth that a person allergic to horses "cannot" be given antivenom, the side effects are manageable, and antivenom should be given rapidly as the side effects can be managed.

Method of preparation
Most antivenoms are prepared by freeze drying (synonym, cryodesiccation, lyophilization). The process involves freezing the antisera, followed by application of high vacuum. This causes frozen water to sublimate. Sera is reduced to powder with no water content. In such an environment, microorganisms and enzymes cannot degrade the antivenom, and it can be stored for up to 5 years [at normal temperatures]. Liquid antivenoms may also be stored for 5 years, but they must be stored at low temperatures [<8 degrees Celsius  (or 46 degrees Fahrenheit)].

Mechanism
Antivenoms act by binding to and neutralizing venoms. The principle of antivenom is based on that of vaccines, developed by Edward Jenner; however, instead of inducing immunity in the person directly, it is induced in a host animal and the hyperimmunized serum is transfused into the person. The host animals may include horses, donkeys, goats, sheep, rabbits, chickens, llamas, and camels. In addition, opossums are being studied for antivenom production. Antivenoms for medical use are often preserved as freeze-dried ampoules, but some are available only in liquid form and must be kept refrigerated. They are not immediately inactivated by heat, however, so a minor gap in the cold chain is not disastrous.

History
Surgeon-Major Edward Nicholson wrote in the November 1870 Madras Medical Journal that he had witnessed a Burmese snake-catcher inoculating himself with cobra venom. However, the snake-catcher was unsure whether this was actually effective and therefore continued to treat his snakes with care. Nicholson, along with other Britons, began to consider that venom might provide its own cure. Although Scottish surgeon Patrick Russell had noted in the late 18th century that snakes were not affected by their own venom, it was not until the late 19th century that Joseph Frayer, Lawrence Waddell, and others began to consider venom-based remedies again. However, they and other naturalists working in India did not have the funding to fully develop their theories. Not until 1895 did Sir Thomas Fraser, Professor of Medicine at the University of Edinburgh, pick up Fayrer and Waddell's research to produce a serum to act against cobra venom. His 'Antivenin' was effective, but failed to make an impact as the public were focused on contemporary Pasteurian discoveries.

Another anti-ophidic serum was developed by Albert Calmette, a French scientist of the Pasteur Institute working at its Indochine branch in 1895, to treat the bites of the Indian Cobra (Naja naja).

In 1901, Vital Brazil, working at the Instituto Butantan in São Paulo, Brazil, developed the first monovalent and polyvalent antivenoms for Central and South American Crotalus and Bothrops  genera, as well as for certain species of venomous spiders, scorpions, and frogs.

In Australia, the Commonwealth Serum Laboratories (CSL) began antivenom research in the 1920s. CSL has developed antivenoms for the redback spider, funnel-web spiders and all deadly Australian snakes.

Availability
There is an overall shortage of antivenom to treat snakebites. Because of this shortage, clinical researchers are considering whether lower doses may be as effective as higher doses in severe neurotoxic snake envenoming.

Snake antivenom is complicated and expensive for manufacturers to produce. When weighed against profitability (especially for sale in poorer regions), the result is that many snake antivenoms, world-wide, are very expensive. Availability, from region to region, also varies.

Internationally, antivenoms must conform to the standards of pharmacopoeia and the World Health Organization (WHO). Antivenoms have been developed for the venoms associated with the following animals:

Spiders

Acarids

Insects

Scorpions

Marine animals

Snakes

Terminology

The name "antivenin" comes from the French word venin, meaning venom, which in turn was derived from Latin venenum, meaning poison.

Historically, the term antivenin was predominant around the world, its first published use being in 1895.  In 1981, the World Health Organization decided that the preferred terminology in the English language would be venom and antivenom rather than venin and antivenin or venen and antivenene.

References

External links
 Antivenom Index, a joint project of the Association of Zoos and Aquariums and the American Association of Poison Control Centers which helps locate rare antivenoms
 Venom Response Program of the Miami-Dade Fire Rescue service

Toxicology treatments
Polyclonal antibodies
Antitoxins
Wikipedia medicine articles ready to translate
World Health Organization essential medicines